Romania competed at the 1998 Winter Olympics in Nagano, Japan.

Biathlon

Men

Women

 1 A penalty loop of 150 metres had to be skied per missed target.
 2 One minute added per missed target.

Bobsleigh

Cross-country skiing

Men

 1 Starting delay based on 10 km results. 
 C = Classical style, F = Freestyle

Women

 2 Starting delay based on 5 km results. 
 C = Classical style, F = Freestyle

Figure skating

Men

Luge

Men

(Men's) Doubles

Women

Speed skating

Men

Women

References
Official Olympic Reports 
 Olympic Winter Games 1998, full results by sports-reference.com

Nations at the 1998 Winter Olympics
1998
Winter Olympics